The Editor is a 2014 Canadian black comedy giallo film by Astron-6 and starring Paz de la Huerta, Adam Brooks, Laurence R. Harvey, and Udo Kier. The film is an homage to and parody of giallo, a cinematic and literary subgenre originating in Italy and popularized through films like The Bird with the Crystal Plumage, Torso, Deep Red, and A Lizard in a Woman's Skin.

The film was shot on-location in Winnipeg, Manitoba and Kenora, Ontario, and premiered at the 2014 Toronto International Film Festival. It was released on home video and VOD platforms on September 8, 2015, and received mixed-to-positive reviews.

Plot

Film editor Rey Ciso works on cutting director Francesco Mancini's latest giallo/poliziotteschi film Tarantola with his beautiful assistant Bella. Once an acclaimed, up-and-coming editor, Rey lost his right-hand fingers in a freak accident and is now handicapped by a prosthetic wooden hand. After hours, an unknown killer sneaks into the studio and kills lead actor Claudio Calvetti and his girlfriend Veronica while they view a workprint of the film. Actress Margarit Porfiry stumbles upon Veronica's hanging body and is stricken with hysterical blindness. Her husband, Police Inspector Peter Porfiry, interviews studio employees.

Claudio's co-star Cal Konitz has his dreams of a larger role in the film are dashed when Mancini introduces Cesare, a lookalike stand-in to replace Claudio. Meanwhile, Police Chief O'Connor pressures Porfiry into closing the case, since Margarit is his daughter. Porfiry begins suspecting Rey, since the victims' fingers were crudely severed in much the same manner as Rey's. Porfiry interviews Mancini, and learns that Rey was once instituted in an asylum.

Back at the studio, Cesare is murdered in the shower and his fingers are severed. With Cesare dead, Francesco instructs Rey to re-cut the film to make Cal the new star. Porfiry questions Rey about his time in the asylum, and Rey recounts how his start in the business as an editor for acclaimed art house director Umberto Fantori, Bella's father, whose debut film The Mirror and the Guillotine earned him critical acclaim and introduced him to his wife, star Josephine Jardin. When his wife was fired by Mancini on her next film, the pressures of editing Fantori's next project, the world's longest film, mounted and Rey accidentally cut off his own fingers in a fit of madness. What Rey doesn't tell him is that he's found what appears to be footage of the murders, taken by an unknown third party. The interview over, Rey returns to work in the editing suite with Bella, where she confesses her love for him, but Rey resists her because he is married. Porfiry, meanwhile, is introduced to Cal's girlfriend Jasmine, who reveals that the two were once lovers. Porfiry remains oblivious to the bladed instruments in Cal's car.

That night after another argument with his wife, Rey has a vision of a dark man with bright blue eyes stalking him from the shadows in his room. Porfiry, meanwhile, infiltrates the asylum where Rey was institutionalized, and meets the director Dr. Casini. Casini tells Porfiry that Rey attempted to kill his assistant Giuseppe, who is now a patient at the asylum himself, his head mysteriously wrapped in bandages. Casini explains to Porfiry Plato's Allegory of the Cave; of men who spend their entire lives believing shadows on the wall to be living, breathing beings.

Porfiry returns him to find that Margarit now has a seeing-eye German Shepherd named Rolfie. After the two make love, the killer breaks into their home and traps Porfiry outside of his room, separated from Margarit. Porfiry break the door down using an axe, but the killer throws Margarit in the way as a body shield, killing her. Porfiry stages the scene to exonerate himself, cutting off Margarit fingers and feeding them to Rolfie. Giancarlo arrives and holds Porfiry at gunpoint, but the Porfiry feeds him alcohol and confuses him into supporting Porfiry's narrative about the incident.

O'Connor berates Porfiry over Margarit's death, and the killer calls him at the station to taunt him. Porfiry convinces O'Connor into supporting a plan where Giancarlo goes undercover as the new editor on Tarantola. Rey meanwhile, has been suffering from blackouts and hallucinations, and finding a bloodied shirt in his editing suite, begins to suspect himself as the killer. Mancini fires him and replaces him with Giancarlo, Rey dejectedly returns home to find Josephine obsessively watching Cal's demo tape. Burning the bloodied shirt in the kitchen sink, Rey begins having strange, otherworldly visions involving Bella; glimpsing a Lovecraftian netherworld filled with massive film reels and boiling tar. Bella meanwhile, finds the footage of the murders. Watching it, she is murdered by the killer; an act echoed in Rey's vision. He rushes to the studio, but arrives too late.

Trying to complete the film without any prior filmmaking knowledge, Giancarlo is beset by venomous tarantulas in the editing suite and is disemboweled by the killer. Over-schedule and over-budget, Mancini rehires Rey to finish the film, Rey revealing that he'd already completed his assembly cut before being fired. Mancini is ecstatic and the film is saved. Porfiry, convinced Rey is the killer, confronts Father Clarke, who tries to tell him his conviction is misguided. He explains an old, Roman-era superstition that editors were believed to be bridges to the netherworld.

Cal, learning that Rey has cut him from the film completely, threatens to kill Rey with a chainsaw. Rey points out that Cal blinks incessantly whenever he tries acting, which lets Rey know that Cal's bluffing. Cal leaves in a huff, but vows to still have his revenge. He tells Porfiry that Rey is a madman, and Porfiry mentions his suspicion that Rey may have ties to the occult, telling Cal that the best way to get to Rey is through his wife. Rey returns home to a ransacked living room with only the television intact. Viewing Cal's demo reel, the Betamax tape suddenly comes to life and begins breathing. Cal kidnaps Rey and forces him to watch him rape Josephine despite Rey's pleas, but Josephine reveals that she's been having an affair with him and plans to leave Rey. That night, Jasmine and Cal are killed during sex by a chainsaw.

While researching the occult at the library, Porfiry is beset by tarantulas. Porfiry brings his findings to Father Clarke, insisting that Rey is the killer. Clarke retorts the Rey is a righteous man, who volunteered to fix the masonry in the broken church bell tower years ago, allowing the bell to keep ringing. Porfiry stumbles across Cal's dead body, and breaks into Rey's house in a fit of rage, only to find occult literature and a film reel filled with severed fingers. Taking this as confirmation of Rey's guilt, Porfiry sets out in search of Rey. Rey is struck by another vision, crawling out of his editing machine covered in tar with bright blue eyes, thus matching the appearance of the killer in his dreams. Porfiry chases Rey by car over a cliff. Rey flees on foot and makes his way to Mancini's mansion, but Porfiry catches up and holds him at gunpoint. Porfiry shoots Rey, but upon turning around is shocked to find Josephine performing an occult ritual; sacrificing Mancini and revealing herself as the true killer. Josephine proclaims herself an incarnation of Death, Porfiry tries to shoot her but she causes his gun to backfire, blowing off the fingers on his right hand. Rey lights his wooden hand on fire and grabs Josephine, setting her ablaze and killing her. In the aftermath, Porfiry reveals that Cal confessed to killing Cesare for a better part in the film, and the two go their separate ways on good terms.

The next day, Porfiry returns to work at police station, but quickly becomes confused by strange incongruities surrounding him. Dr. Casini is the staff psychiatrist and Jasmine is his nurse, Josephine and Rey were never together, Giancarlo is alive and a full Inspector who solved the case, and Porfiry's injuries are now only minor. Confused, Porfiry rushes to the church to speak to Father Clarke, who tells him that the belfry has remained damaged and the bell hasn't rung in over 100 years. Porfiry runs to the top of the tower, and digging through the damaged masonry finds a skull atop a stack of film reels. Examining the frames, he sees a reflection of himself repeating the same actions. Horrified, Porfiry screams, realizing that he is in another dimension, a camera pull-back revealing him to be in the studio editing machine.

In a post-credits scene, Rey returns home to his wife; in this reality Bella.

Cast 

 Adam Brooks as Rey Ciso
 Matthew Kennedy as Inspector Peter Porfiry
 Paz de la Huerta as Josephine Jardin
 Conor Sweeney as Cal Konitz
 Samantha Hill as Bella
 Udo Kier as Dr. Alberto Casini
 Laurence R. Harvey as Father Clarke
 Kevin Anderson as Francesco Mancini
 Sheila Campbell as Margarit Porfiry
 Jerry Wasserman as Police Chief O'Connor
 Dan Bern as Umberto Fantori
 Brent Neale as Giancarlo
 Jasmine Mae as Jasmine Rain
 Brett Donahue as Claudio Berti
 Tristan Risk as Vernoica
 Lance Cartwright as Cesare
 William O'Donnell as Giuseppe

Reception
The Editor has a 58% approval rating on Rotten Tomatoes, based on 12 reviews. Mark L. Miller of Ain't It Cool News ranked it the 25th best horror film released between October 1 of 2014 and 2015, deeming it Astron-6's "most successful and entertaining film to date".

References

External links
 

2014 films
2014 black comedy films
2010s parody films
2014 comedy horror films
2010s comedy thriller films
2010s slasher films
2010s mystery films
English-language Canadian films
Films shot in Winnipeg
Canadian black comedy films
Giallo films
Slasher comedy films
Comedy mystery films
Canadian comedy horror films
2010s English-language films
2010s Canadian films